Hypsioma amydon is a species of beetle in the family Cerambycidae. It was described by Dillon and Dillon in 1945. It is known from Brazil, Peru and Ecuador.

References

amydon
Beetles described in 1945